Rauisuchidae is a group of large (up to  or more) predatory Triassic archosaurs. There is some disagreement over which genera should be included in Rauisuchidae and which should be in the related Prestosuchidae and Poposauridae, and indeed whether these should even be thought of as separate valid families. Rauisuchids occurred throughout much of the Triassic, and may have first occurred in the Early Triassic if some archosaurian taxa such as Scythosuchus and Tsylmosuchus are considered to be within the family.

An early cladistic analysis of crocodylotarsan (pseudosuchian) archosaurs included Lotosaurus, Fasolasuchus, Rauisuchus, and "the Kupferzell rauisuchid" (later called Batrachotomus) within Rauisuchidae. However, a later study found that Batrachotomus was a more basal pseudosuchian only slightly more "advanced" than Prestosuchus. In addition, the toothless Lotosaurus has been found to be more closely related to the Ctenosauriscidae, a clade of poposauroids with sails on their backs.

Two genera previously classified as poposaurids, are in fact rauisuchids. These include Teratosaurus  and Postosuchus.

Genera

References

External links
 Taxon Search - Rauisuchidae
 Rauisuchidae - Mikko's Phylogeny Archive.
 Re: Postosuchus/Rauisuchus - Dinosaur Mailing List archives
 Rauisuchidae - Dinosaur Mailing List archives

 
Early Triassic first appearances
Late Triassic extinctions
Prehistoric reptile families